Coiflets are discrete wavelets designed by Ingrid Daubechies, at the request of Ronald Coifman, to have scaling functions with vanishing moments.  The wavelet is near symmetric, their wavelet functions have  vanishing moments and scaling functions , and has been used in many applications using Calderón–Zygmund operators.

Theory
Some theorems about Coiflets:

Theorem 1
For a wavelet system , the following three
equations are equivalent:

 

Theorem 2
For a wavelet system , the following six equations
are equivalent:

 

Theorem 3
For a biorthogonal wavelet system , if either  or 
possesses a degree L of vanishing moments, then the following two equations are equivalent:

 

for any  such that

Coiflet coefficients
Both the scaling function (low-pass filter) and the wavelet function (high-pass filter) must be normalised by a factor . Below are the coefficients for the scaling functions for C6–30. The wavelet coefficients are derived by reversing the order of the scaling function coefficients and then reversing the sign of every second one (i.e. C6 wavelet = {−0.022140543057, 0.102859456942, 0.544281086116, −1.205718913884, 0.477859456942, 0.102859456942}).

Mathematically, this looks like , where k is the coefficient index, B is a wavelet coefficient, and C a scaling function coefficient. N is the wavelet index, i.e. 6 for C6.

Matlab function
F = coifwavf(W) returns the scaling filter associated with the Coiflet wavelet specified by the string W where W = 'coifN'. Possible values for N are 1, 2, 3, 4, or 5.

References 

Orthogonal wavelets
Wavelets